Grant Dean Horton (born 13 September 2001) is an English professional footballer who plays as a defender for League of Ireland Premier Division club Bohemians on loan from  club Cheltenham Town.

Career

Cheltenham Town
Grant made his EFL League Two debut for Cheltenham Town on 7 December 2019, coming on as a 93rd minute substitute for Sean Long in a 3–0 away win against Mansfield Town. He signed his first professional contract with the club after graduating from the youth team in the summer of 2020. In May 2021 he signed a new two-year contract with Cheltenham after the club won promotion as League Two champions.

Bromsgrove Sporting (loan)
Horton joined newly promoted Southern League Premier Central side Bromsgrove Sporting on 16 August 2019.

He played one game for Bromsgrove Sporting, which came in the FA Cup, in a 2–1 home victory against Leicester Road on 24 August 2019. Horton came on as a half time substitute for Will Shorrock.

He returned to Cheltenham Town on 29 August 2019, following the return from injury of Tom Taylor.

Yate Town (loan)
On 13 September 2019, Horton joined Yate Town on loan.

Chippenham Town (loan)
In December 2019, he joined Chippenham Town on loan until the end of the season.

Bath City (loan)
After featuring in Cheltenham's EFL Trophy squad at the start of the 2020-21 season, Horton joined Bath City of the National League South on loan on 18 November 2020.

Bohemians (loan)
On 21 January 2022, Horton joined League of Ireland Premier Division club Bohemians on loan for their 2022 season that ends at the end of November 2022. On 12 July 2022, Horton was recalled by Cheltenham after making 11 appearances for Bohemians, scoring 1 goal. Horton returned to Bohemians on loan for the 2023 League of Ireland season. He scored the first goal in a 2-1 victory for Bohemians against Cork City in the opening game of the season.

Honours

Cheltenham Town
EFL League Two: 2020–21

References

External links

2001 births
Living people
English footballers
Association football defenders
Cheltenham Town F.C. players
Worcester City F.C. players
Bromsgrove Sporting F.C. players
Yate Town F.C. players
Bath City F.C. players
Bohemian F.C. players
League of Ireland players
English Football League players
National League (English football) players
Southern Football League players
Expatriate association footballers in the Republic of Ireland
English expatriate sportspeople in Ireland